Minister of Education of Angola is a cabinet level position in the national government. The position was established in 1975 with Ambrósio Lukoki.

Name changes
 1975–2002: Minister of Education and Culture
 2002–present: Minister of Education

Ministers of Education
 1975–1981: Ambrósio Lukoki
 1981–1991: Augusto Lopes Teixeira
 1991–1992: António Burity da Silva Neto
 1992–1996: João Manuel Bernardo
 1996–2010: António Burity da Silva Neto
 2010–2017: Mpinda Simão
 2017–present: Maria Cândida Pereira Teixeira

References

External links

Education
Education Ministers
Politics of Angola